Jane by Design is an American comedy-drama television series on ABC Family. The series follows the life of Jane Quimby (Erica Dasher), a teenager who is mistaken for an adult, as she finally gets her fashion dream job working with a world-famous designer, Gray Chandler Murray (Andie MacDowell). She has to juggle between two secret lives: one in high school, and one in high fashion.

ABC Family greenlit the series in April 2011 with a ten-episode order. The series premiered on January 3, 2012, following Switched at Birth. On February 29, 2012, the series was given an eight-episode back order. It premiered in the summer on June 5, 2012 and ended on July 31, 2012. On August 17, 2012, ABC Family announced that the show was canceled after one season.

Premise
Jane Quimby, (Erica Dasher) is a teenager, mistaken for an adult, who lands her fashion dream job. She must balance her high school life and her job. She has her best friend Billy (Nick Roux) help her out, although he had a relationship with Lulu (Meagan Tandy), a girl who has been mean to Jane since the seventh grade. Now Billy dates the new girl, Zoe, which makes Jane feel like he's replacing her. Jane's father died and her mother ran out on Jane and Ben before the series started. Jane's mother has returned home to Jane and Ben, and she stays awhile. Her brother Ben (David Clayton Rogers) tries to make money by getting jobs, but the jobs never work out until he lands one as the athletic assistant at Jane's school. At Donovan Decker, Jane discovers a world full of fashion challenges working for Gray Chandler Murray (Andie MacDowell) and tackles them with the help of her co-workers, Jeremy Jones (Rowley Dennis), India Jourdain (India de Beaufort), Carter (Ser'Darius Blain) and Birdie (Brooke Lyons). Jane tries to be the best at her job and her school, juggling the everyday challenges of high school and the world of fashion.

Cast and characters

Main
 Erica Dasher as Jane Quimby, the main protagonist and a high-school student who is also a personal assistant to fashion designer Gray. Everyone at her work doesn't know shes in high school and she keeps it a secret from everyone at school except Billy and eventually her brother Ben. Jane has an older brother Ben, and after their father's death, he is made her guardian. Besides Ben, Jane has Billy in her life as her best friend, with whom she shares all her secrets. Jane has been shown to have crushes on Nick Fadden, Eli Chandler, and Jeremy Jones.
 Nick Roux as Billy Nutter, Jane's best friend since childhood. Billy had a secret physical relationship with "it girl" Lulu, but ends it after realizing that she doesn't want to go public with it. He later starts dating Lulu publicly, much to Jane's dismay. They later break up after he was publicly called trash (along with his brother) at a party, held by Nick Fadden, and Lulu made no move to defend him. He left the party with his brother while Lulu stayed. In the mid-season finale, Billy had tried to reveal his feelings toward Jane telling her "It's you, Janey" but was interrupted by Jeremy. After spending two months in juvenile detention for helping his brother try to escape the scene of a crime, Billy returned to school wanting to keep his friendship with Jane intact. He met Zoe, an apparently rebellious student, telling her he enjoyed being with someone who didn't judge him like Lulu, unaware that Zoe is wealthy herself. He discovers the truth but still wants to be with her. He never again tries to be with Jane but Jane realizes she wants to be with him. He takes over as the lead in the school play opposite Zoe when Nick gets hurt.
 Rowly Dennis as Jeremy Jones, Jane's coworker and a "ladies' man". He has been shown to like Jane. He was seeing India, but later broke it off after she stole Jane's wedding gown design. In the mid-season finale "The End of the Line", it was revealed that Jeremy was the mole hired by Beau Bronn to steal Donovan Decker's designs. When India returns as a consultant, she tells Jeremy she knows the truth and threatens to expose him unless he helps her take down Gray. At Jane's birthday party, a drunken Jeremy confesses to Jane the truth and she walks away upset. Then Jeremy runs away when Jane threatens to tell Gray.
 David Clayton Rogers as Benjamin "Ben" Quimby, Jane's older brother. After the death of their father, he becomes Jane's guardian. He works at Jane's high school as the assistant athletic director and is friends with the guidance counselor Rita Shaw, who he used to make fun of in high school. He realizes his feelings for Rita on the school camping trip when he comes to odds with another teacher who has set his sights on Rita. After their mother returns Ben takes the opportunity to finally live out his lifelong dream when he is offered a minor league baseball contract. In the series finale he returns to be there for Jane and also to tell Rita that he wants to get back together.
 India de Beaufort as India Jourdain, the series' main antagonist and Jane's pretentious colleague. She always tries to sabotage Jane and steal Gray's job. But many times she does show true emotion and kindness only to rebuff it with her bad attitude. In the mid-season finale, she is wrongfully accused of being the mole in Donovan Decker, and fired by Gray. She returns, now working for Harrod's department store and the firm has to impress her to win a contract. She secretly confronts Jeremy, having realized he was the mole and threatens to expose him unless he helps her take down both Gray and Jane.
 Meagan Tandy as Lulu Pope, the antagonist in Jane's high school life and daughter of a judge and an It girl of the high school. She seems to like Billy, but wants to keep her relationship with him a secret. She later decides to go public with their relationship, but still feels embarrassed over their relationship. She is rather hostile towards Jane and shows jealousy of Jane and Billy's friendship. A regular cast member in the first ten episodes, in episode "The Replacement", Tandy was demoted to recurring status.
 Matthew Atkinson as Nick Fadden, Jane's schoolgirl crush since the seventh grade. He does, however seem to show interest in Jane, even going as far as to ask Billy and Ben's advice on approaching her. They then begin to date much to Billy's dismay. He and Billy become friends but their friendship and his and Jane's relationship ends when he cheats on her with Lulu Pope. While he and Lulu are dating, he still has feelings for Jane. He plays baseball, but he tore a shoulder ligament. Since he can't play baseball, the new drama teacher tells him to audition for her new play based on Cinderella. He auditions for the role of "Prince Charming" and gets it. On the eve of the play he sprains an ankle, leaving the lead to Billy.
 Andie MacDowell as Gray Chandler Murray, a world-famous fashion designer at Donovan Decker, and Jane's boss. She's very strict and straightforward, and is certain India wants to steal her job. Although she is defined as a heartless woman, she does acknowledge Jane's value as her assistant on occasion. She was promoted as Creative Director of Donovan Decker.

Recurring
 Smith Cho as Rita Shaw, the guidance counselor at Jane's high school, who often gives Ben advice about his job and about being a guardian to Jane. She revealed to Ben that she had a crush on him back when they were in high school, however he was not very nice to her during those years. They kiss in the episode "The Getaway" and dated until the episode "The Celebrity", when she breaks up with him, because he was going too fast. However, when Amanda Clark, "the popular girl" from Rita and Ben's school days appears and shows an interest in Ben, Rita becomes jealous.
Ser'Darius Blain as Carter, a Donovan Decker employee, who Jane always asks for a favor.
 Brooke Lyons as Birdie, the human resources director of Donovan Decker who is often helpful to Jane.
 Bryan Dechart as Eli Chandler, Gray's nephew, who now works for the Donovan Decker company. As of the episode "The Backup Dress," he and Jane were once dating but then they break up because Eli cheated with India. Eli also believes Jane should be with Billy since she only really tells him her secrets.
 Mariah Buzolin as Zoe Mendez, a new transfer student who shows interest in Billy. She comes off as a cocky and troublemaking student who Billy likes as an equal. He was unaware that Zoe was from a wealthy family until he followed her home after a date, believing she planned to rob a mansion and learned that the mansion was actually her home.
Briga Heelan as Amanda Clark, a big-time actress, former "popular girl" of Whitemarsh High School and is now the drama teacher there. She begins showing romantic interest in Ben, much to Rita's dismay.
 Christopher B. Duncan as Judge Bentley Pope, Lulu's strict father who disapproves of her dating Billy.
 Rob Mayes as Tommy Nutter, Billy's troublesome older brother who has been in Judge Pope's courtroom many times.
 Oded Fehr as Beau Bronn, Gray's ex-husband and fashion nemesis.
 Teri Hatcher as Kate Quimby, Ben and Jane's long lost mother. It was previously reported that Hatcher was to direct an episode of the series (marking her directorial debut), however this did not occur.

Special cameo appearances
 Patricia Field as Herself
 Stefano Tonchi as Himself
 Nanette Lepore as Herself
Christos Garkinos as Himself
Cameron Silver as Himself
Rose Apodaca as Herself
 Betsey Johnson as Herself
 Amy Astley as Herself
 Paulina Porizkova as Herself
Brandon Holley as Himself
Booth Moore as Herself
Christopher Benz as Himself
 Kelly Osbourne as Herself
 Christian Siriano as Himself
 Tamara Mellon as Herself
 Nina Garcia as Herself

Episodes

Cancellation and intended season 2 plans
On August 17, 2012, ABC Family announced that the series was canceled. On August 21, 2012, in an interview with Hollywoodlife.com, creator/executive producer April Blair revealed the plans that she had for the show's second season. The storylines that were to happen in season two were: Eli would find out about Jane's secret and would cover for her from Gray ever finding out. Jane and Billy share their first kiss. Ben and Rita become engaged. Jeremy would start his own independent fashion label competing with Donovan Decker and his romance with India would continue to grow, along with them being professional rivals. Amanda would begin dating a teacher named Todd (who previously had romantic feelings for Rita), as well as continuing to compete with Rita. Lastly, Kate would return to town.

International broadcasts

South Pacific
In  on TVNZ's TV2 from April 15, 2012 (Sunday afternoon). The show resumed airing from episode 11 on December 22, 2013.

Europe

In  on MTV Spain from May 2, 2012 under the title Diseñando a Jane.

In  on DeeJay TV from October 2, 2012 under the title Jane stilista per caso.

In  on Disney Channel from May 31, 2015 under the title Jane by Design.

Africa
In  on M-Net Series from June 1, 2012.

Americas

In  on ABC Spark from September 4, 2012.

Asia

Home media release

Jane by Design: Season 1, Volume 1 contains the first ten episodes of the series. It was released as a two-disc box set on Region 1 DVD in the US and Canada on March 20, 2012. All episodes of Jane by Design are also available through Hulu as well as Amazon Video and the iTunes Store where each episode can be purchased separately or as the complete series.

In Japan, the show is known as 地味っこジェーンの大胆な放課後. A Japanese DVD was released on February 4, 2015. It is currently available through Amazon Japan Prime Video, GyaO, and Rakuten TV.

Critical reception
Jane by Design received initially mixed critical reviews. Metacritic gave the pilot episode 54 out of 100, based upon 7 critical reviews. The New York Daily News gave show with 60/100 commenting that the "drama thickens fast, and if the creators keep stirring rapidly, 'Jane by Design' could become the same good soapy fun as its best ABC Family 'Sister, Sister' and compared with 'The Devil Wears Prada.'"

"There are worse ideas, and Jane by Design has the potential to be an amusing and endearing show — thanks largely to the performance of Erica Dasher as Jane Quimby, the smart and plucky star who steps into the Anne Hathaway role." The New York Times wrote of the series that "It's refreshing, and ultimately unnerving, to see just how naïve Jane Quimby (Erica Dasher) is at the outset of Jane by Design."

Los Angeles Times gave the show its highest score, with 70/100, commenting that the show "is not merely pandering to the teenage base. 'Jane by Design' is a font of fulfilled wishes, but they come from actual work, even if that work is presented in kicky-fun, pop-driven montage. The show is aspirational and at times genuinely exciting. You care enough about Jane, thanks in large part to Dasher, who is charming and funny, that you want her to have her cake and her ice cream too." Pittsburgh Post-Gazette saying "Jane is a decent enough little show but it's difficult to imagine how its writers will manage to sustain the premise." People Weekly compared with Ugly Betty TV Guide gave the show with negative critical and says "[A] toothless hourlong teen-com." "If stealing from The Devil Wears Prada wasn't enough, there are also echoes of the far superior Ugly Betty in the workplace (including an evil co-worker out for Andie's job) and Pretty in Pink at school, where Jane hangs with a faux-hawked hipster misfit best bud who somehow isn't named Duckie. In the first episode, Jane risks missing a vital midterm if she attends a critical meeting called by her boss's rival. In the second episode, once again double-booked, she races back and forth between a high-fashion preview party and the school's winter formal, where she's scored a date with the jock she has long pined for (shades of MTV's awesome Awkward, though this is merely inept). Guess whose self-constructed party dress ends up on the runway? If only it all weren't so synthetic. How long before Jane has to choose between graduation and a cover shoot? Hoping for better later this week when Project Runway: All Stars premieres."

U.S. Nielsen ratings
The following is a table with the average estimated number of viewers per episode of Jane by Design on ABC Family.

References

External links
Official website (ABC Family) - Archive
 - Freefrom

2010s American comedy-drama television series
2010s American high school television series
2010s American teen drama television series
2012 American television series debuts
2012 American television series endings
ABC Family original programming
English-language television shows
Fashion-themed television series
Television series about teenagers
Television shows set in New York (state)
Television series by Disney–ABC Domestic Television